Tabanus aegrotus is a species of horse-fly in the family Tabanidae.

Distribution
Canada, United States.

References

Tabanidae
Insects described in 1877
Diptera of North America
Taxa named by Carl Robert Osten-Sacken